Admiral José Prudencio Padilla López (19 March 1784, in Riohacha, – 2 October 1828) was a Neogranadine military leader who fought in the Spanish American wars of independence. He is best known for his victory in the Battle of Lake Maracaibo on 24 July 1823, in which a royalist Spanish fleet was defeated.

Life and career

José Prudencio Padilla (Riohacha, March 19, 1784 - Bogotá, Colombia, October 2, 1828) was a hero in the battles of independence for Gran Colombia (present-day Colombia, Venezuela, Ecuador and Panama). He was the foremost naval hero of the campaign for independence led by Simón Bolívar, the creator of the first Navy and Admiral of Great Colombia.

His parents were Andres Padilla, who was a builder of small boats, and Lucia Lopez. He started life as a seaman in the domestic service of merchant's vessels at both overseas ports and the Spanish homeland at 14 years old and appeared as a porter at the Royal Spanish chamber of the New Kingdom of Granada. On October 21, 1805, he received his baptism of fire at the battle of Trafalgar, where he was taken prisoner by the English. In 1808, after his release he returned to Spain, where he was appointed to the boatswain's arsenal at Cartagena de Indias. On April 11, 1811, he took part in the decision of the people of Gethsemane, who, in sympathy with the city of Cartagena, joined in the proclamation of independence of Cundinamarca, thus disregarding the authority of the metropolis. In 1814, he saw action at Tolu and captured a Royalist sloop of war with a crew of 170 that was heading to Panama. Although the ship he captured had more powerful guns than the one he commanded, it could not resist the attack and surrendered. In recognition of this, the Granadino government awarded Padilla with a promotion as the second frigate lieutenant.

In 1815, he served under the command of Simón Bolívar when he went from Bogotá to Santa Marta to free Cartagena de Indias, there they were besieged by the army of General Pablo Morillo, they attempted to hold defense until it became impossible to hold the siege back. Later on he went to Jamaica, and as Captain, he met Bolívar in Haiti to reinforce the expedition which sailed from Los Cayos de San Luis on March 31, 1816, where he won the naval victory at Los Frailes (May 2), and conducted the landing at Carúpano (June 1). Afterwards, he was promoted to frigate captain and commander in chief of the riverine forces, where he made significant inroads over the province of Cumana. In 1819, he participated in the campaign of Casanare, in which he managed the transportation of troops and war material. As second-in-command to Admiral Luis Brión he arrived at Riohacha on March 12, 1820, where he fought in the battles of Laguna Salada, Pueblo Viejo, Tenerife, La Barra, Ciénaga de Santa Marta and San Juan. Named commander-in-chief of the forces of the Republic that besieged Cartagena, he captured several Spanish vessels. On April 19, 1823, he was promoted to brigadier general of the Colombian Navy. This time he was invested with the office of commander-general of the Third Department of the Navy and of the Zulia Theater of Operations; on this position, he did a brilliant job that culminated on July 24, 1823, in the naval battle of Lake Maracaibo, in which he defeated the Spanish squadron, which led to the capitulation of the field marshal Francisco Tomás Morales the following August 3, 1823.

On November 24, 1826, he was promoted to general of division. However, at the beginning of 1828, Padilla was linked to an act of indiscipline in which several officers were involved in Cartagena, after which he was reduced and sent to prison in Bogotá on May 26, 1828. During the night of September 25, 1828, it was carried out an attack on the life of the Liberator (Septembrina Conspiracy), while the assault was executed at San Carlos Palace, some conspirators scaled the walls of the building which served as a prison, and attempted assassination of Colonel José Bolívar, releasing Padilla and appointing him as chief. There is no record of his escape, but he was judged by a tribunal for the charge of conspiracy, then sentenced to death and executed in the Plaza de la Constitución in Bogotá on 2 Oct. 1828. The remains of Admiral Padilla lie inside the Cathedral of Our Lady of Remedios in Riohacha, which was declared in his honor as a Cultural Heritage of the Colombian nation.
He has been commemorated in Venezuela, with the naming of the Almirante Padilla Municipality in Zulia State.

References

 José Prudencio Padilla 

1784 births
1828 deaths
People from La Guajira Department
Colombian people of Jamaican descent
People of the Colombian War of Independence
People of the Venezuelan War of Independence
Admirals
Colombian military personnel
Colombian abolitionists
Executed Colombian people